The 1944 United States presidential election in Wisconsin was held on November 7, 1944 as part of the 1944 United States presidential election. State voters chose 12 electors to the Electoral College, who voted for president and vice president.

Background
Politics in Wisconsin since the Populist movement had been dominated by the Republican Party. The Democratic Party had been uncompetitive outside certain eastern German as the upper classes, along with the majority of workers who followed them, fled from William Jennings Bryan's agrarian and free silver sympathies. Although the state did develop a strong Socialist Party to provide opposition to the GOP, Wisconsin developed the direct Republican primary in 1903 and this ultimately created competition between the "League" under Robert M. La Follette, and the conservative "Regular" faction. This ultimately would develop into the Wisconsin Progressive Party in the late 1930s, which was opposed to the conservative German Democrats and to the national Republican Party, and allied with Franklin D. Roosevelt at the federal level.

During the 1940 presidential election, fought whilst the United States was still neutral in World War II, the conservative German counties, especially the "WOW counties" near Milwaukee and other counties along the Lake Michigan coast, turned abruptly away from Roosevelt. These counties viewed Russian Communism as a much greater threat to America than German Nazism, and believed Roosevelt offered too much aid to Britain and France. The result was that the historically Democratic German Catholic counties like Kewaunee and Calumet rivalled longtime GOP bastions like Waupaca and Waushara Counties as the most Republican in the state, and GOP nominee Wendell Willkie came within two points of carrying the state after Alf Landon had lost by two-to-one four years earlier.

Vote
Early Gallup polls in August showed Republican nominee Thomas E. Dewey leading Roosevelt in Wisconsin by as much as twelve percentage points at the end of the second week of that month. The fact that the state's disintegrating Progressive Party was divided on whether to support Roosevelt did nothing to help the President, neither did Dewey's claim that Roosevelt had close ties to Communists at home and abroad.

Although wartime conditions limited campaigning in the state by the two Dutchess County natives, by mid-October polls had not changed from where they were two months previously. At that time Governor Dewey visited Milwaukee on a rail trip to Minneapolis, and more detailed opinion polls later in October said that powerful isolationist sentiment in rural Wisconsin and tighter unity of his opposition would ensure that Roosevelt had little hope of holding the state.

Ultimately Dewey carried Wisconsin as polls had predicted he would, although by a substantially smaller margin of just 1.80 percentage points. Continuing trends in Third Party System Democratic counties around Green Bay and Appleton proved decisive in tipping the state, as Dewey tightened Willkie gains that would not be substantially reversed in the ensuing eighty years: even during Lyndon B. Johnson's 1964 landslide, Republican Barry Goldwater did much better in this area than he did nationally.

Results

Results by county

See also
 United States presidential elections in Wisconsin

References

Wisconsin
1944
1944 Wisconsin elections